Adriana Debora Kugler is a Colombian-American economist. She is the U.S. Executive Director at the World Bank, nominated by President Biden and confirmed by the U.S. Senate last April. She is a professor of public policy at Georgetown University and she is currently on leave from her tenured position at Georgetown. She served as the Chief Economist to U.S. Labor Secretary Hilda L. Solis from September 6, 2011 to January 4, 2013.

Education
Adriana Kugler received her Bachelor of Arts degree from McGill University in 1991, graduating with first class joint honors in economics and political science. In 1997, she was awarded her Ph.D. by the University of California at Berkeley, Ph.D.; her advisors were Nobel laureate George Akerlof, Nada Eissa, and David K. Levine.

Academic appointments
Dr. Adriana Kugler was Vice-Provost for Faculty for Georgetown from 2013-2016 and is currently a full professor at the McCourt School of Public Policy. She was founder and co-director of the International Summer Institute on Policy Evaluation between 2010-2013. She served as chief economist of the U.S. Department of Labor between 2011 and 2013, where she worked actively on developing policies and proposals on unemployment insurance, training programs, retirement benefits, overtime pay and minimum wages, immigration, disability insurance and occupational safety regulations. Prior to coming to Georgetown, she was a full and associate professor at the economics departments at the University of Houston  and at Pompeu Fabra University  in Barcelona.

Kugler is a research associate with the National Bureau of Economic Research in the Labor Studies program and a research fellow of the Center for Economic Policy Research (CEPR) in London, the Institute for the Study of Labor (IZA) in Bonn, the Centre for Research and Analysis of Migration (CReAM) in London, and the Center for the Study of Poverty and Inequality at Stanford University and senior fellow at the Center for American Progress.

Kugler has served on the editorial boards of the Industrial and Labor Relations Review, The Journal of Labor and Development, the British Journal of Industrial Relations, Labour Economics, Applied Economics Quarterly and Economia.

Political appointments
On August 4, 2021, President Joe Biden nominated Kugler to be the U.S Executive Director of the International Bank for Reconstruction and Development. Her initial nomination was withdrawn by President Biden on September 20, 2021, because of a typo in her name and she was renominated that same day.

President Biden renominated her on January 4, 2022, to be considered under the new session of Congress. Kugler was favorably reported by the Senate Foreign Relations Committee on December 15, 2021, and again on March 8, 2022. The entire Senate confirmed her nomination by voice vote on April 7, 2022.

Research
Kugler continues to research and work with policies that help stimulate youth employment, as well as observe the effect varieties of policies have on worker mobility and job quality. Her research includes labor markets and policy evaluation in developed and developing countries. Her work also includes contributions on the role of public policies (including payroll taxes, employment protections, occupational licensing, and unemployment insurance), unemployment, and immigration.

Research awards
Kugler was the 2007 recipient of the John T. Dunlop Outstanding Scholar Award from the Labor and Employment Relations Association, in recognition of her research contributions to the field of labor and industrial relations.

In 2010, one of her papers, "Trade Reforms and Market Selection: Evidence from Manufacturing Firms in Colombia" won first prize for Best Contribution in the area of "Globalization, Regulations and Development" from the Global Development Network.

She has been the recipient of numerous research grants for studies in areas that include the role of public policies, unemployment, and immigration on labor markets and policy evaluation in developed and developing countries.

Selected publications
Kugler's work has been published in the top general interest and specialized journals in Economics and Public Policy, including the American Economic Review, the Review of Economic & Statistics, the American Economic Journal: Applied Economics, the Economic Journal, the Journal of Labor Economics, the Journal of Public Economics, the Journal of Development Economics and the Journal of Policy Reform. Her research has been covered in multiple reports, including the World Development Report published by the World Bank, and the annual development reports published by the Inter-American Development Bank and the OECD.

"Trade and Market Selection: Evidence from Manufacturing Plants in Colombia," (with Marcela Eslava, John Haltiwanger, and Maurice Kugler), Review of Economic Dynamics, 16.1 (2013): 135-158.
"Katrina's Children: Evidence on the Structure of Peer Effects from Hurricane Evacuees," (with Scott Imberman and Bruce Sacerdote), American Economic Review, 102(5): 2048-82, August 2012.
Featured in the Houston Chronicle on September 12, 2009, the San Antonio Express News on September 12, 2009, and the Houston Business Journal on September 11, 2009.

"Employment Consequences of Restrictive Permanent Contracts: Evidence from Spanish Labor Market Reforms," (with Juan F. Jimeno and Virginia Hernanz), CEPR Working Paper No. 3724, 2003 (revision at Journal of the European Economic Association).
Featured in the World Development Report 2006 and 2007.

"Factor Adjustments after Deregulation: Panel Evidence from Colombian Plants," (with Marcela Eslava, John Haltiwanger and Maurice Kugler), Review of Economics and Statistics, May 2010, 92(2).
"Employment and Social Security: An Alternative View," in Bjorn Lomborg, ed., Latin American Development Priorities: Costs and Benefits, Cambridge University Press, 2010.
"Market Reforms, Factor Reallocation, and Productivity Growth in Latin America," (with Marcela Eslava, John Haltiwanger, and Maurice Kugler), in Norman Loayza and Luis Serven, eds. Business Regulation and Economic Performance, World Bank and Stanford University Press, 2010.
"Labor Market Effects of Payroll Taxes in Developing Countries: Evidence from Colombia," (with Maurice Kugler), Economic Development and Cultural Change, January 2009, 57(2).
"Rural Windfall or Resource Curse? Coca, Income and Civil Conflict in Colombia," (with Joshua Angrist),
Lead Article in Review of Economics and Statistics, May 2008, 90(2).
"Do Employment Protections Reduce Productivity?
"The Effects of Employment Protection in Europe and the U.S.," Opuscle, CREI, 2007.
"Plant Turnover and Structural Reforms in Colombia" (with Marcela Eslava, John Haltiwanger, and Maurice Kugler), IMF Staff Papers, 2006, 53.
"Effects of Employment Protection and Product Market Regulations on the Italian Labor Market," (with Giovanni Pica), in Julian Messina, Claudio Michelacci, Jarkko Turunen, and Gylfi Zoega, Eds., Labour Market Adjustments in Europe. Edward Elgar, 2006.
Featured in the World Development Report 2005.
"Doctors without Borders? Relicensing Requirements and Negative Selection in the Market for Physicians" (with Robert Sauer), Journal of Labor Economics, July 2005, 23(3).
"Wage-Shifting Effects of Severance Payments Savings Accounts in Colombia," Journal of Public Economics, February 2005, 89(2-3).
Featured in the World Development Report 2005, IDB's Report on the Economic and Social Progress of Latin America 2004, and in the OECD's Employment Outlook 2004.
"The Effect of Structural Reforms on Productivity and Profitability Enhancing Reallocation: Evidence from Colombia" (with Marcela Eslava, John Haltiwanger, and Maurice Kugler), Journal of Development Economics, December 2004, 75(2).
Featured in the World Development Report 2005.
"Effects of Trade on Job Reallocation: Evidence from Latin America" (with John Haltiwanger, Maurice Kugler, Alejandro Micco, and Carmen Pages), Journal of Policy Reform, December 2004, 7(4).
"The Effect of Job Security Regulations on Labor Market Flexibility: Evidence from the Colombian Labor Market Reform," in James J. Heckman and Carmen Pagés, Eds., Law and Employment: Lessons from Latin America and the Caribbean. Chicago: The University of Chicago Press, 2004.
Featured in the World Development Report 2006 and 2007, and IDB's Report on the Economic and Social Progress of Latin America 2004.
"The Reversal of Inequality in Colombia, 1978-95: A Combination of Persistent and Fluctuating Forces" (with Cesar Bouillón, José Leibovich, Jairo Núñez, and Carlos Eduardo Vélez) in François Bourguignon, Francisco Ferreira, and Nora Lustig, Eds., The Microeconomics of Income Distribution Dynamics in East Asia and Latin America. Oxford: Oxford University Press, 2004.
Featured in the World Development Report 2004.
"Protective or Counter-Productive? Labor Market Institutions and the Effect of Immigration on EU Natives" (with Joshua Angrist), Economic Journal, June 2003, 113.
Reprinted in Andrew Morris and Samuel Estreicher, Eds., Cross-Border Human Resources, Labor and Employment Issues. Hague: Kluwer Law International, 2005.
Featured in the Economist's Economics Focus July 7th 2005, World Development Report 2007, Expert Report to United Nations' National Assembly on International Migration and Development 2008.
"The Impact of Firing Costs on Turnover and Unemployment: Evidence from the Colombian Labor Market Reform," International Tax and Public Finance Journal, August 1999, 6(3).
Reprinted in Enrique Bour, Daniel Heymann and Fernando Navajas, Eds., Latin American Economic Crisis. Hampshire, UK: Palgrave MacMillan, 2004.
Featured in the Presidential Address of the Society of Labor Economists 2001.
"What Factors Contributed to Changes in Employment During and After the Great Recession," (with Ammar Farooq) Journal of Labor Policy, 4:3, February 28, 2015.
"Beyond Job Lock: Impacts of Public Health Insurance on Occupational and Industrial Mobility," (with Ammar Farooq), January 2016.
"The Effect of Providing Breakfast on Student Performance: Evidence form an In-Class Breakfast Program" (with Scott Imberman), Journal of Policy Analysis and Management, Summer 2014, 33(3).
"Labor Market Analysis and Labor Policy Making in the Nation's Capital," Industrial and Labor Relations Review, Spring 2014, 67(3).

For the above articles, as well as more complete lists of Published Articles and Research Papers (and links to her research papers), reference may be made to Kugler's internet pages at the University of Houston and Georgetown Public Policy Institute.

Media coverage
Kugler's academic and policy work has been covered in print media as well as radio and television, including The Washington Post, The Economist, NPR, NBC Latino, Fox Business, the Financial Times, Telemundo, Univision, NTN24, National Journal, The Atlantic, U.S. News & World Report, MSNBC, CNBC, The New York Times, BBC Mundo, CNNMoney, the Los Angeles Times, the Chicago Tribune, and Nightly Business News, amongst others. Kugler has also been called on to testify before Congress on issues such as immigration and the economy.

References

21st-century American economists
Chief Economists of the United States Department of Labor
Living people
Georgetown University faculty
American women academics
McGill University alumni
University of California, Berkeley alumni
University of Houston faculty
1969 births
21st-century American women